Microposthia is a genus of worms belonging to the family Actinoposthiidae.

Species:
 Microposthia listensis Faubel, 1974

References

Acoelomorphs